Jawun B. Evans (born July 26, 1996) is an American professional basketball player for Maccabi Rishon LeZion of the Israeli Basketball Premier League. A point guard, he played college basketball for Oklahoma State, Evans was named an All-American in the 2016–17 season.

High school career

Jawun Evans attended Southside High School in Greenville, South Carolina. As a freshman, scored 26 points to lead Southside High School over Wade Hampton in the 2012 Upper State championship game. Southside finished with an 18–10 record and a runner-up finish in the South Carolina Class 3A state championship game. He transferred to Legacy Early College in Greenville, South Carolina for his sophomore year (2012–13) while playing under his Southside Coach, B.J. Jackson. He dominated and played against some of that year's top talent programs. He later moved to Texas.

After moving from South Carolina to Dallas, Texas, Evans starred at Justin F. Kimball High School in his Junior and Senior year, where he was named to the Parade All-America team and the McDonald's All-American Game in 2015. He chose Oklahoma State over Illinois, USC and Texas, among others. In the Summer before his freshman year at Oklahoma State, Evans played for the United States in the FIBA Under-19 World Championship in Greece, where Team USA won the championship by defeating Croatia in overtime.

College career
As a freshman, Evans averaged 12.9 points, 4.9 assists and 4.4 rebounds per game. He scored a Cowboys freshman record 42 points against arch-rival Oklahoma and at the close of the season was named the Big 12 Conference Freshman of the Year, despite missing more than a month of the season after injuring his shoulder in a February 3, 2016 game. Returning his sophomore season, Evans was named preseason All-Big 12. At the close of the regular season, he was named first-team all-conference and a third-team All-American by Sporting News magazine.

Professional career

Los Angeles Clippers (2017–2018)
On June 22, 2017, Evans was drafted by the Philadelphia 76ers with the 39th selection in the 2017 NBA draft. On July 6, 2017, he was traded to the Los Angeles Clippers in exchange for cash considerations.

On October 15, 2018, Evans was waived by the Los Angeles Clippers.

Northern Arizona Suns (2018)
He signed with the Northern Arizona Suns of the NBA G League on November 4, 2018.

Phoenix & Northern Arizona Suns (2018–2019)
On December 7, 2018, Evans was signed by the Phoenix Suns to a two-way contract. On March 23, 2019, the Suns waived Evans.

Oklahoma City Thunder (2019)
On March 25, 2019, Evans was claimed off waivers by the Oklahoma City Thunder.

Raptors 905 (2019–2020)
Evans was on the opening night roster of the Raptors 905 in 2019. He averaged 8 points, 4 assists, and 5 rebounds per game but suffered a major injury. On March 6, 2020, he was waived after it was determined his injury was season-ending.

Promitheas Patras (2021)
On January 16, 2021, Evans signed with Promitheas Patras of the Greek Basket League.

Raptors 905 (2021–2022)
Evans rejoined the Raptors 905 in October 2021.

Cleveland Charge (2022)
On January 6, 2022, Evans was traded to the Cleveland Charge of the NBA G League.

Juventus Utena (2022–present)
On September 6, 2022, Evans signed a one-year deal with Juventus Utena of the Lithuanian Basketball League (LKL).

Career statistics

NBA

Regular season

|-
| style="text-align:left;"| 
| style="text-align:left;"| L.A. Clippers
| 48 || 4 || 16.2 || .352 || .278 || .776 || 1.8 || 2.1 || .8 || .1 || 4.8
|-
| style="text-align:left;" rowspan="2"| 
| style="text-align:left;"| Phoenix
| 7 || 0 || 9.1 || .231 || .000 || – || 1.7 || 1.4 || .4 || .0 || .9
|-
| style="text-align:left;"| Oklahoma City
| 1 || 0 || 1.0 || .000 || .000 || – || .0 || .0 || .0 || .0 || .0
|- class="sortbottom"
| style="text-align:center;" colspan="2"| Career
| 56 || 4 || 15.1 || .345 || .263 || .776 || 1.7 || 2.0 || .7 || .1 || 4.2

NBA G League

Regular season

|-
| style="text-align:left;"| 2017–18
| style="text-align:left;"| Agua Caliente
| 1 || 1 || 27.9 || .182 || .000 || – || 4.0 || 4.0 || 1.0 || .0 || 4.0
|- class="sortbottom"
| style="text-align:center;" colspan="2"| Career
| 1 || 1 || 27.9 || .182 || .000 || – || 4.0 || 4.0 || 1.0 || .0 || 4.0

College

|-
| style="text-align:left;"| 2015–16
| style="text-align:left;"| Oklahoma State
| 22 || 20 || 28.9 || .471 || .475 || .833 || 4.4 || 4.9 || 1.1 || .2 || 12.9
|-
| style="text-align:left;"| 2016–17
| style="text-align:left;"| Oklahoma State
| 32 || 32 || 29.3 || .438 || .379 || .812 || 3.4 || 6.4 || 1.8 || .1 || 19.2
|- class="sortbottom"
| style="text-align:center;" colspan="2"| Career
| 54 || 52 || 29.1 || .448 || .407 || .818 || 3.8 || 5.8 || 1.5 || .1 || 16.6

References

External links
Oklahoma State Cowboys bio
USA Basketball bio
DraftExpress profile
Proballers.com profile

1996 births
Living people
21st-century African-American sportspeople
African-American basketball players
Agua Caliente Clippers players
All-American college men's basketball players
American expatriate basketball people in Canada
American expatriate basketball people in Lithuania
American men's basketball players
Basketball players from Dallas
BC Juventus players
Cleveland Charge players
Los Angeles Clippers players
McDonald's High School All-Americans
Northern Arizona Suns players
Oklahoma City Thunder players
Oklahoma State Cowboys basketball players
Parade High School All-Americans (boys' basketball)
Philadelphia 76ers draft picks
Phoenix Suns players
Point guards
Raptors 905 players